The WAGR Q class was a two-member class of 4-6-0 steam locomotives operated by the Public Works Department (PWD) and later Western Australian Government Railways (WAGR) between 1928 and 1953.

History
In November 1927, the PWD's Railway Construction Branch awarded a tender to Andrew Barclay Sons & Co., Kilmarnock for two 4-6-0 locomotives.

Both locomotives entered service with the PWD on 31 July 1928 named Wiluna and Nornalup after contemporary construction projects. On 5 January 1931, responsibility for the Railway Construction Branch of the PWD was transferred to the WAGR, with both included and numbered Q62 and Q63. They were withdrawn on 25 October 1949 and 9 October 1953 respectively and scrapped.

Namesakes
The Q class designation was previously used for the Q class locomotives that were withdrawn in 1925. It was reused in the 1990s when the Westrail Q class diesel locomotives entered service.

See also

Rail transport in Western Australia
List of Western Australian locomotive classes

References

Notes

Cited works

External links

Andrew Barclay locomotives
Railway locomotives introduced in 1928
Q WAGR class (1928)
3 ft 6 in gauge locomotives of Australia
4-6-0 locomotives